Mati Kola (also Romanized as Matī Kolā; also known as Mateh Kolā, Matteh Kalā, and Matteh Kolā) is a village in Esbu Kola Rural District, in the Central District of Babol County, Mazandaran Province, Iran. At the 2006 census, its population was 1,166, in 312 families.

References 

Populated places in Babol County